Kenneth Lawrence Fisher (born November 29, 1950) is an American billionaire investment analyst, author, and the founder and executive chairman of Fisher Investments, a fee-only financial adviser. Fisher's Forbes "Portfolio Strategy" column ran from 1984 to 2017, making him the longest continuously-running columnist in the magazine's history. Fisher is now known for writing monthly, native language columns in major media outlets spanning Western Europe and Asia. The list includes the UK's "Financial Times"; Germany's "Focus Money"; Denmark's leading business newspaper, "Børsen"; the Netherlands' largest newspaper, "De Telegraaf"; Switzerland's leading business paper, "Handelszeitung"; Spain's largest business website and newspaper, "elEconomista"; Italy's third largest newspaper and number one business paper, "Il Sole 24 Ore"; France's "L'Opinion"; Belgium's "La Libre"; Austria's "Trend; Caixin"; the "Hong Kong Economic Journal"; Taiwan's "Business Weekly"; South Korea's largest business paper, "Chosun Mint"; Japan's "Diamond Weekly"; and Singapore's "The Business Times", among others. Fisher has authored eleven books on investing, and research papers in the field of behavioral finance. As of August 2022, his net worth is estimated at US$5.1 billion. In 2010, he was included in Investment Advisor magazine's "30 for 30" list of the 30 most influential people in the investment advisory business over the last 30 years. As of December 2021, Fisher's firm managed $208 billion.

Life and work
Kenneth Fisher was born in San Francisco, California, the son of influential stock investor Philip A. Fisher. Fisher was raised in San Mateo, California. As a 13-year-old, he earned $1.20 an hour picking fruit, sawing and fertilizing. He dropped out of high school and went to Humboldt State University to study forestry, and graduated with an associate degree in economics in 1972. Humboldt State recognized Fisher with its Distinguished Alumni Award in 2007. In 2015, Fisher was appointed to the board of advisors of the Forbes School of Business at Ashford University.

Over the past few decades, Fisher has helped Fisher Investments become one of the largest independent money managers in the world. He started his firm in 1979 with $250 and it has grown to over $100 billion in assets under management.

In 2007, Fisher and Thomas Grüner founded Grüner Fisher Investments in Germany. In 2009, Fisher received the inaugural Tiburon CEO Summit award for Challenging Conventional Wisdom. Fisher also has a Bernstein Fabozzi/Jacobs Levy Award for his research on market forecasting, which he published in 2000 with Meir Statman of Santa Clara University.

In 2011, Fisher was ranked as one of the top 25 most influential figures in the financial industry by Investment Advisor Magazine.

Personal life
Fisher is married, with three adult sons, Nathan, Jesse and Clayton. He lives in Dallas, Texas. Nathan Fisher is the senior executive vice president of Fisher Investments 401(k) Solutions.

Investment research and philosophy
Fisher's theoretical work identifying and testing the price-to-sales ratio (PSR) is detailed in his 1984 Dow Jones book, Super Stocks. James O'Shaughnessy credits Fisher with being the first to define and use the PSR as a forecasting tool. In Fisher's 2006 book, The Only Three Questions That Count, he states that the PSR is widely used and known, and no longer as useful as an indicator for undervalued stocks.

According to The Guru Investor by John P. Reese and Jack M. Forehand, in the late 1990s, Fisher defined his investment philosophy after studying the stock returns and P/E Ratios between January 1976 and June 1995 of six investment categories: large-cap value, mid-cap value, small-cap value, large-cap growth, mid-cap growth, and small-cap growth.

Small-cap value was not defined as an investing category until the late 1980s. Fisher Investments was among the institutional money managers offering small-cap value investing to clients in the late 1980s.

Columns, books and other media

Fisher is well-known for his investment columns, which have been published in a variety of publications globally. Fisher's Forbes 'Portfolio Strategy" column ran from 1984 to 2017. His columns have also been published in the UK's "Financial Times"; Germany's "Focus Money"; Denmark's leading business newspaper, "Børsen"; the Netherlands' largest newspaper, "De Telegraaf"; Switzerland's leading business paper, "Handelszeitung"; Spain's largest business website and newspaper, "elEconomista"; Italy's third largest newspaper and number one business paper, "Il Sole 24 Ore"; France's "L'Opinion"; Belgium's "La Libre"; Austria's "Trend; Caixin"; the "Hong Kong Economic Journal"; Taiwan's "Business Weekly"; South Korea's largest business paper, "Chosun Mint"; Japan's "Diamond Weekly"; and Singapore's "The Business Times", among others. Fisher also publishes regular YouTube videos answering common investor questions and appears on major US and international broadcast media, including Bloomberg TV, CNBC, CNBC India, CNBC Asia, CNN International and Fox News.

Fisher has authored eleven investing books, six of which were national best sellers: Super Stocks (1984), The Wall Street Waltz (1987), 100 Minds that Made the Market (1993), The Only Three Questions That Count (2006), The Ten Roads to Riches (2008), How To Smell A Rat (2009), Debunkery (2010), Markets Never Forget (2011), Plan Your Prosperity (2012), The Little Book of Market Myths (2013), and Beat The Crowd (2015). The Only Three Questions That Still Count, The Ten Roads to Riches, How to Smell a Rat, and Debunkery were all New York Times bestsellers.

In 2015, Fisher released Beat the Crowd: How You Can Out-Invest the Herd by Thinking Differently. In an interview with CNN Money, Fisher discusses how media hype around major economic events have already been priced into stock markets globally, and why investors are better served worrying about factors the market is ignoring. Fisher released the Second Edition of The Only Three Questions That Count in April 2012, and the Second Edition of The Ten Roads to Riches in April 2017.

Fisher Investments

Fisher is founder and chairman of Fisher Investments, an independent money management firm. He founded the firm in 1979, incorporated in 1986, then served as CEO until July 2016, when he was succeeded by long-time Fisher Investments employee Damian Ornani. Fisher remains active as the firm's executive chairman and co-chief investment officer.

Interests 
Fisher's ongoing study of redwood ecology, particularly the emerging field of study of redwood canopies, grew from his childhood in San Mateo, California, near ancient redwood logging camps. Fisher's personal library contains more than 3000 volumes of regional logging history.

In 2006, Fisher gave $3.5 million to endow the Kenneth L. Fisher Chair in Redwood Forest Ecology at Humboldt State. The gift supports redwood ecology research in perpetuity and provides support for graduate students, laboratories, and field equipment; the research has focused particularly on canopy studies. Fisher's goal in creating the chair was to transform our understanding of trees and forests.

In 2012, Fisher and his wife gave $7.5 million to Johns Hopkins University to fund the new Sherrilyn and Ken Fisher Center for Environmental Infectious Diseases. After much deliberation, Fishers donation was approved.

Controversy
In October 2019, Fisher was criticized for references he made during a fireside chat at an industry conference sponsored by Tiburon Strategic Advisors. Bloomberg initially reported that Fisher made references to genitalia and likened winning money-management clients to "trying to get into a girls' pants." In a Bloomberg interview at the time, Fisher said he felt his comment were taken out of context. In February 2020, Bloomberg clarified their reporting and wrote that Fisher cautioned against using financial planning as a way to sign up new clients and compared it to approaching a woman at a bar. A recording made at the Tiburon conference, obtained by CNBC and referenced by Bloomberg, captures Fisher saying "you wouldn't go up to a woman in a bar and ask what's in your pants." 

On October 11, 2019, it was announced that in response to Fisher's comments, the state of Michigan withdrew its pension fund of $600 million from Fisher Investments. On October 16, 2019, the city of Boston pulled their $248 million pension fund from Fisher Investments due to Fisher's off-color comments.

Other repercussions followed. Fidelity announced it was reviewing the $500 million in assets that it has Fisher's organization manage, and Philadelphia's board of pensions terminated its relationship with Fisher. Within weeks of the incident Fisher Investments lost more than $2.7 billion as several institutional clients, including government pensions, severed their relationship with the firm. The firm Fisher founded is taking action as well. Fisher Investments Chief Executive Damian Ornani wrote a memo to employees stating: “Ken’s comments were wrong.” He said the firm was taking steps to address diversity and inclusion within the organization itself. Reporting from Bloomberg L.P. contended that this behavior was commonplace at Fisher Investments and that Fisher himself had made derogatory remarks a number of times before.

References

Further reading
 "Never Enough Fisher", by Anthony W. Haddad and Jonathan Bernard. Equities. September 2007.
 "Uber-Fisher", by Anthony W. Haddad and Jonathan Bernard. Equities. May 2008.

External links

Fisher Investments Official website

1950 births
Living people
American finance and investment writers
American money managers
American billionaires
American financial analysts
Businesspeople from the San Francisco Bay Area
Stock and commodity market managers
California State Polytechnic University, Humboldt alumni